Isogenous may refer to:
 Of abelian varieties, the property of being linked by an isogeny
 An isogenous group of cells in medicine

See also 

 Isogenic (disambiguation)